Joseph Lapira (born August 13, 1986, Rochester, New York) is a retired soccer player. Born in the United States, Lapira is a one time international for the Republic of Ireland national football team. Besides the United States, he has played in Norway and India.

Early life
Lapira graduated from St. Louis Catholic High School in Lake Charles, Louisiana. After high school, he continued a family tradition and attended the University of Notre Dame. He is of Maltese descent.

Club career
In 2006, he was the winner of the Hermann Trophy, awarded to the top collegiate player of the year, after scoring 22 goals for Notre Dame. During his college years, Lapira also played in the USL Premier Development League with Louisiana Outlaws, Lafayette Swamp Cats and Baton Rouge Capitals.

In April 2007, it was reported that Lapira would be joining Scottish Premier League side Aberdeen for a trial at some point in summer 2007, although he eventually went on trial at Rangers instead. Lapira broke down with a calf injury minutes into his first training session with the Ibrox club. In January 2008, Lapira finally joined Aberdeen for a week-long trial after recovering from his calf injury. He played for the reserve side in a 1-1 draw with Falkirk reserves but did not do enough to earn a contract with the Dons.

Instead, Lapira was selected in the third round of the 2008 MLS SuperDraft by Toronto FC, but never signed a contract with Major League Soccer.

On April 1, 2008, Lapira signed with Norwegian Adeccoligaen side Nybergsund IL-Trysil, who played in the second tier after being promoted from the third tier in 2007. Lapira scored a brace in his Nybergsund debut, a 3-0 victory.

In March 2011, Lapira signed for I-League 2nd Division side United Sikkim FC.

In the summer of 2011, Lapira returned to Norway after signing again with Nybergsund IL-Trysil.

Career statistics

International career
Lapira is a full international for the Republic of Ireland. He qualifies for the Republic by virtue of his Irish mother, and came to the attention of former Irish boss Steve Staunton through  Lapira's uncle, who worked at the FAI. He gained a cap for Ireland on May 23, 2007 against Ecuador, becoming the first amateur player to play for Ireland since Willie Browne in 1964.

Awards and honours
M.A.C. Hermann Trophy Winner (2006)
Soccer America National
Player of the Year (2006)
All-America First Team (2006)
All-BIG EAST First Team (2006)
BIG EAST Offensive
Player of the Year (2006)
All-BIG EAST Third Team (2005)
Participated in the 2019 Joe Lapira FIFA tournament, placing a respectable 21st out of 22 participants (2019)

See also
 List of Republic of Ireland international footballers born outside the Republic of Ireland

References

External links
Joseph Lapira University of Notre Dame
Republic of Ireland 1 Ecuador 1 Match report Sporting Life, May 24, 2007

Living people
1986 births
Republic of Ireland association footballers
Republic of Ireland international footballers
American soccer players
American people of Irish descent
American people of Maltese descent
American expatriate soccer players
Notre Dame Fighting Irish men's soccer players
Association football forwards
Louisiana Outlaws players
Lafayette Swamp Cats players
Baton Rouge Capitals players
Soccer players from Louisiana
Soccer players from New York (state)
Sportspeople from Lake Charles, Louisiana
USL League Two players
United Sikkim F.C. players
Toronto FC draft picks
Hermann Trophy men's winners
All-American men's college soccer players
Irish people of Maltese descent
Expatriate footballers in India